In Greek mythology, Nike (ancient: ,) was a goddess who personified victory in any field including art, music, war, and athletics. She is often portrayed in Greek art as Winged Victory in the motion of flight; however, she can also appear without wings as "Wingless Victory" when she is being portrayed as an attribute of another deity such as Athena. In Greek literature Nike is described as both an attribute and attendant to the gods Zeus and Athena. Nike gained this honored role beside Zeus during the Titanomachy where she was one of the first gods to offer her allegiance to Zeus. At Athens, Nike became a servant to Athena as well as an attribute of her due to the prominent status Athena held in her patron city. The fusion of the two goddesses at Athens has contributed to the ambiguity surrounding Nike's origins. It is unclear whether she originated from a character trait of the Greek goddess Athena or has always existed as an independent deity. Her origin story in Greek mythology is also slightly ambiguous, with the Theogony claiming Nike to be the daughter of Styx and Pallas while the Homeric Hymns describe Ares as being Nike's father. Her Roman equivalent was Victoria.

Etymology
While the Greek word νίκη (nikē) is of uncertain etymology, R.S.P. Beekes has suggested a Pre-Greek origin. However, it has also been speculated to have derived from the Proto-Indo-European neik- meaning to attack or "start vehemently." If this is true it would make the word cognate with Ancient Greek νεῖκος (neîkos, "strife") and Lithuanian ap-ni̇̀kti ("to attack").

Origins of Nike 
Nike and Athena are both associated with victory, which has resulted in contestation over the origins of Nike. According to a paper by Harrison (as cited in Sikes, 1895) Nike was once a facet of the Greek goddess Athena, who was composed of Boulaia (good council), Ergane (skilled handcraft), and Nike (victory). According to this theory, Nike eventually broke off from Athena to form her own distinct personality. Baudrillart, in another paper (as cited in Sikes, 1895), shares a similar view that Nike was once a part of Athena and separated from her around the 5th century. However, he holds that the Athena Nike personality continued to exist alongside the distinct Nike personality. In contrast to Harrison and Baudrillart's views, E.E. Sikes believed that Nike was always a distinct personality from Athena. According to Sikes, Nike existed as an independent deity from Athena since Nike represented victory in musical, athletic, and military competitions and Athena's authority was limited to strictly military victories. Sikes postulates that the theory that Nike first originated from Athena arose from the confusion of the two goddesses at Athens where Athena Nike and Nike existed alongside each other.

In Greek mythology Nike, the personification of victory, has two possible origin stories. According to Hesiod's Theogony, "Styx, daughter of Oceanus, in union with Pallas, bore... trim-ankled Victory [Nike]..." as well as her siblings Zelus (Zeal or Aspiration), Kratos (Strength), and Bia (Power). This lineage is also supported by the Bibliotheca where "...Nice, Cratos, Zelos, and Bia" are described as the children of the Titans Pallas and Styx. In another source, Homeric Hymn 8, Ares the God of War is portrayed as the "...father of warlike Victory."

Mythology

Nike is often portrayed in literature in close association with Zeus or Athena. She is typically described as either an attendant of the Greek Gods Zeus and Athena or as a facet of their personalities. According to the Theogony Nike, Zelus, Kratos, and Bia "...will not live apart from Zeus... nor go except where the god goes before them, but they sit for ever beside heavy-booming Zeus." Nike and her siblings achieved these honorable positions by Zeus's side during the Titanomachy. During the war with the Titans Zeus called all the gods to Olympus to determine their allegiance. He declared that any god that chose to align with him against Kronos would receive his honor and favor. Of the gods, Styx and her children were the first to declare their loyalty to Zeus and as a result Zeus granted her and her children his favor. For Styx he gave her the honor of being "...the great oath of the gods..." For her children Zeus granted them his eternal favor by allowing them "...to dwell with him for all time." As a result, Nike is often portrayed in literature in association with Zeus since she holds an honorable position by his side: "Victory... in golden Olympus, standing beside Zeus..."

In Nonnos' Dionysiaca, Nike is described as an emissary of Athena who was sent to aid Zeus in his battle against Typhon. When the many snake-headed giant Typhon laid siege to Olympus in the final days of the Titanomachy, Nike, in the form of Leto, reproached Zeus for his hesitancy in confronting Typhon and urged him to gather his thunderbolts in preparation to defend Olympus. In her speech she mentions all the gods that have given up and fled the battle including Ares, Hermes, Apollo, Aphrodite, and Hephaistos. She also mentions the possible repercussions of allowing Typhon to win, which includes the destruction of Olympus and the rape and enslavement Zeus's daughters Athena and Artemis. When in the morning Typhon again issued his challenge, Zeus gathered the clouds around himself for armor and answered the monster's threats. Nike, described as Victory, led Zeus into battle as Eris, Strife, led Typhon. During the fighting Nike used her shield to protect Zeus while he fought with his thunderbolts and frigid rain. By assaulting Typhon with fire and ice, Zeus was able to defeat the monster and claim victory over the Titans. As Zeus rode off from the battlefield, Nike followed him driving her father's chariot. In the Theogony, this battle is described in a different manner. Zeus is neither hesitant nor fearful and Nike makes no appearance to encourage or aid Zeus in the fighting.

Nike is also depicted in literature as a goddess who judges the excellence of gods and mortals in competition. This role of assessing the greatness of skill of a god or mortal is most evident in war, where Nike is often depicted on the side of the victor granting them the victory. An example if this is in Ovid's Metamorphoses book 8 where the fate of the war between Megara and Crete hung in "...suspense; so, Victory day by day between them hovered on uncertain wings." However, Nike's role of judging excellence is not limited to strictly military prowess. Instead, Nike observes victory in any field including musical, athletic, and or military competitions. For instance in Pindar Nemean 5, the victorious athlete Euthymenes of Aegina has "twice fallen into the arms of Victory" and achieved fame. In Bacchylides Ode 12 Nike encourages Teisias of Aegina to compete in the wrestling matches at Nemea. In both these examples Nike is associated with victory in an athletic competition rather than only a military competition. Typically, Nike is the one who bestows the victor with the prize. In Bacchylides Ode 11 she is introduced with the stock epithet "giver of swift gifts..." However, Nike is also represented in some sources as the prize in a contest to symbolize victory: "... the blossoms of glory-bringing Victory nurture for men golden, conspicuous fame throughout their lives..." In this source Nike is portrayed as a garland of flowers to be bestowed upon the victor during the Panhellenic Games.

Depiction in art

Nike alone is often depicted in Greek art winged and carrying a symbol of victory, such as a wreath or palm frond. Statues of her attempt to evoke a sense of flight. In the Archaic period of ancient Greek sculpture Nike often appears in a "kneeling run" pose or "knielaufen" pose with her head turned to the side to look at the viewer as her body swiftly rushes forward. The marble statue of Nike, possibly designed by Arkhermos of Chios and found at Delos, dates to around 550 BCE and exemplifies this style of pose. Nike's right arm is outstretched at an angle while her left arm is bent so that her hand rests upon her upper thigh. Her wings are attached to her upper back and her body runs to the side while her head is turned to observe the viewer instead of the place she is running to. Richard Neer proposes that this posture with the running stance, wings, and flowing garments were meant to evoke the swift speed of the goddess.

As time goes on Nike's legs begin to straighten and her movement becomes a more subtle alighting movement with a slight forward component. An example of a transitional phase in movement from the "kneeling run" to the alighting and striding pose is Paionios's statue of Nike discovered in the Temple of Zeus at Olympia. This statue of Nike was made of Parian marble and was dedicated to Zeus by the Messenians and Naupaktians around 420 BCE during the Classical period. The statue originally stood near the temple of Zeus on an 8.45m high, three sided pillar. The statue itself was roughly two meters high and was orientated to face the east. Instead of flying sideways, Paionios's Nike advances forward with feet just alighting upon the ground. At her feet an eagle is shown to fly to the viewer's left as Nike moves forward with left leg stepping down to touch the earth. Her left arm is raised and once held her himation, or outer robe, as it blew out behind her in the wind. Fragments of Nike's face, forearms, and wings are missing, however, pieces of her wings can still be seen attached to her shoulders. In this statue of Nike from the fifth century the goddess's alighting motion is towards the viewer as opposed to the sideways running motion of earlier statues. Additionally, Paionios's Nike has adopted a striding stance as opposed to a pinwheel-type running stance. By changing Nike's stance, Paionios has relinquished depiction of Nike's swift speed in favor of depicting her in a forward alighting motion that directly engages the viewer.

By the mid Classical period and the start of the Hellenistic period, statues of Nike begin to portray her with legs almost completely straight in an alighting pose meant to evoke an appearance out of nothing rather than a hurtling into view. This slight forward and downward motion is illustrated in the Capitoline Nike (460 BCE) from Magna Grecia. This statue was made of Thasian marble and showed the goddess standing almost completely straight with a slight lean forwards to indicate Nike's downward and slight forward alighting motion. Although her wings are lost, the roots of them can still be seen behind her shoulders. The straight lines of her garments imply weightiness and the pull of gravity during her gentle descent. The slight overfold of her peplos across the midsection also evokes the sense of a small wind blowing upwards from her soft descent. Additionally, both of her feet are placed side by side in a standing pose rather than a striding pose. All these details suggest Nike is appearing and making a graceful descent to the earth rather than dashing sideways into view. The statue of Nike from the Temple of Neptune at Corfu also implies a gently appearance out of nothing rather than a hurtling from somewhere. This statue is speculated to be from the Hellenistic period according to Andrew Parkin. The statue is made of white marble and is seventy-three centimeters tall. Nike herself is posed atop a globe, which is acting as the base. While Nike's forearms and wings are missing the sockets for attaching her wings can be seen on her back. The goddess is standing with both legs straight and together. Her head is bent downwards slightly so that her gaze rests on the ground rather than the viewer. As a result of this, her body also leans slightly downwards. Her winged, straight, and slightly bent posture evokes the appearance that she is looking down at where to place her feet as she descends. The Nike of Corfu also has a hollowed out back which has resulted in Parkin, C. Vermeule, and D. Von Bothmer to hypothesize that the statue was originally mounted on another base or the statue was intended to fit into the hand of a larger deity.

During the Classical period, statuettes of Nike were often placed in the hands of larger deities. One such example is Pheidias's statue of Zeus at Olympia. According to Pausanias's Description of Greece, the statue of Zeus "...holds Victory in ivory and gold..." in his right hand and a scepter with an eagle perched atop it in his left hand. Pheidias's cult statue of Athena from the Parthenon in Athens also held a smaller Nike statuette in one hand and a spear in the other. According to Pausanias, this Nike statue was roughly four cubits tall (about seventy-two inches). Both Nike statues in Zeus's and Athena's hands were winged. Nike typically appears without wings in Greek sculpture when she is being represented as an attribute of another deity, such as Athena. The Athena Nike statue within the Temple of Athena Nike on the Athenian Acropolis depicts the Greek goddess wingless and seated with a pomegranate in her right hand and her helmet in her left hand. According to Andrew Stewart the doffed helmet and pomegranate are symbols of assistance, fertility, and peace. According to the Suda, Athena Nike without wings represents calm civility, the pomegranate represents prosperity and the doffed helmet represents peace. In his Description of Greece Pausanias claims that Athena Nike's depiction as "Wingless Victory" was meant to keep the goddess in Athens.

Cults 
While Nike was often included in the cults of other gods, particularly Zeus and Athena, very few sanctuaries were dedicated solely to her. Pausanias noted that there was an altar solely to Nike in Olympia next to the altar of Zeus Purifier. He also mentioned the Temple of Athena Nike in Athens: "On the right of the gateway [of the Akropolis in Athens] is a temple of Nike Apteron (Wingless Nike)."

The Cult of Athena Nike

Athena Nike 

In Athens Nike was often honored alongside Athena or as an attribute of Athena, where she was called Athena Nike. According to Sikes, Nike was worshipped as a facet of Athena because Athena was Athens's patron goddess and thus held greater power in her own city and acropolis. Since Athena held greater power in Athens, she acquired some of the functions traditionally only Nike possessed as well as her title of Victory. Thus, the two goddesses merged into one to form the Athena Nike personality. The distinct Nike personality continued to coexist alongside the Athena Nike personality and became a servant to Athena, or a "Lady of Victory" according to Sikes. The three votive processions on the parapet of the Temple of Athena Nike display this relationship between Athena and Nike. On both the north and south sides an array of winged Nikes are shown carrying offerings to Athena who sat seated at the west end of each stream of Nike. As a result of the merging of the two goddesses Athena Nike was worshipped as a goddess of victory in Athens, particularly military victory.

The Priestesses of Athena Nike 
The cult of Athena Nike was functioning as early as the beginning of the sixth century. However, there remains significant debate over whether the cult of Athena Nike in its earlier years had its own priestess, no priestess, or if it shared a priestess with a nearby cult. The earliest substantial evidence for a priestess of Athena Nike is provided in a decree named IG i^3 35 passed in the early fifth century by the Athenian Demos. This decree proposed a plan for a new temple and priestess for Athena Nike. The decree was unusual because it broke with Athenian tradition by handing over control of the cult to the state and instituting a democratic selection of the next priestess of Athena Nike by lot from all Athenian women. According to Michael Laughy, the priesthood was traditionally controlled by a genos or family clan who selected the next priestess from one of their heirs. For example, the priestess of Athena Polias was the heir of the aristocratic Eteoboutadai genos, since they controlled the priesthood for Athena Polias. Thus, the process of selecting a priestess in Athens was not traditionally a democratic process. This decree was also significant, according to Josine Blok, because it gave all Athenian women access to influential and prominent cultic roles in the Athenian city-state during a time when Athenian women's freedoms were fairly limited. The final unusual aspect of the decree was that it broke with Athenian tradition by handing over responsibility of the priesthood from the genos to the state. According to Laughy, ancestral practice played a key role in how Athenian cultic rituals and sacrifices were performed. Thus, a break in custom to transfer religious authority from the genos to the state was exceptional for Athens during that time as it transformed the cult of Athena Nike into a polis-cult, a cult funded and overseen by the Athenian city-state.

While the decree does not state the identity of the new priestess, a verse epitaph on a marble stele funerary monument reveals that the first priestess of Athena Nike to be selected democratically by lot was Myrrhine, daughter of Kallimachos. According to decree IG i^3 36, she would have received a portion of the sacrifice and a stipend of fifty drachmas paid for by the kolakretai. While neither decrees specified the tenure of her office, Blok proposes that Myrrhine would have likely served for life since that was the tradition for Athenian women serving in cultic offices. Her responsibilities are described in the Myrrhine epigram (IG i^3 1330) and include maintaining the sanctuary and its statues.

Family tree

See also
 307 Nike
 Altar of Victory
 Ángel de la Independencia
 Goddess of Victory: Nikke, named after the goddess
 Nike of Paros
 Operation Niki
 The Temple of Athena Nike
 The University of Melbourne, which has Nike depicted in its emblem
 Winged Victory of Samothrace

Citations

General and cited references 
 Smith, William; A Dictionary of Greek and Roman Antiquities. William Smith, LLD. William Wayte. G. E. Marindin. Albemarle Street, London. John Murray. 1890. Online version at the Perseus Digital Library.

External links

 Goddess Nike

War goddesses
Greek war deities
Greek goddesses
Personifications in Greek mythology
Children of Ares
Epithets of Athena
Deeds of Zeus
Victory
Avian humanoids
Ancient Greece in art and culture
Olympian deities
Shapeshifters in Greek mythology
Pages including recorded pronunciations